The Manning executive council was the 18th executive council of British Ceylon. The government was led by Governor William Manning.

Executive council members

See also
 Cabinet of Sri Lanka

References

1918 establishments in Ceylon
1925 disestablishments in Ceylon
Cabinets established in 1918
Cabinets disestablished in 1925
Ceylonese executive councils
Ministries of George V